Víctor Hugo Mella González (born November 14, 1974 in Santiago, Chile), referred as Victor Mella, is a Chilean former football (soccer) forward who spent two seasons in Major League Soccer, two in the Chilean leagues and three in Mexico.

Career
Mella began his career in the Colo-Colo youth program. In February 1996, the San Jose Clash selected Mella in the ninth round of the 1996 MLS Inaugural Player Draft.  He played the team's first five games before being waived.  On May 24, 1996, the New England Revolution claimed him off waivers.  He played only three league games with the Revolution before being released.  He returned to Chile where he spent the 1997 season playing for Colo-Colo and on loan for Everton de Viña del Mar.  On January 15, 1998, he signed again with the Clash.  This time, he played 31 games, scoring 4 goals. He then moved to Mexico until 2003 when he finished his career with Atlético Celaya at the age of 28.

Post-retirement
Following his retirement, he made his home in Veracruz, Mexico, and worked as coach of football academies.

References

External links
 
 
 Victor Mella at PlaymakerStats

1974 births
Living people
Footballers from Santiago
Chilean footballers
Chilean expatriate footballers
Colo-Colo footballers
C.D. Arturo Fernández Vial footballers
San Jose Earthquakes players
New England Revolution players
Everton de Viña del Mar footballers
Real Sociedad de Zacatecas footballers
Deportes Magallanes footballers
Magallanes footballers
Atlético Celaya footballers
Chilean Primera División players
Primera B de Chile players
Major League Soccer players
Ascenso MX players
Chilean expatriate sportspeople in the United States
Expatriate soccer players in the United States
Chilean expatriate sportspeople in Mexico
Expatriate footballers in Mexico
Association football forwards
Chilean football managers
Chilean expatriate football managers
Expatriate football managers in Mexico